Pascale Quiviger (born 1969) is a Canadian writer and artist. Raised and educated in Quebec, she is currently based in the United Kingdom, where she writes, paints, teaches visual arts and practices hypnotherapy. Quiviger is married to former British Labour MP  Alan Simpson and lives in Nottingham.

Quiviger published her first volume of short stories, Ni sols ni ciels (Instant même), in 2001, and her first novel, Le Cercle parfait, in 2004. Le Cercle parfait won the 2004 Governor General's Award for French Fiction; its English translation by Sheila Fischman, The Perfect Circle, was shortlisted for the 2006 Scotiabank Giller Prize. She followed this with an essay, Un point de chute, in 2006, and two novels, La maison des temps rompus in 2008 and "Pages à brûler" in 2010. She is also the author of an artist book, "Below Zero", published in 2005. In 2020, Lazer Lederhendler's English translation of Quiviger's novel If You Hear Me, won the Governor General's Literary Award.

References

Additional References 

 

1969 births
Living people
Writers from Quebec
Canadian women novelists
Canadian short story writers in French
20th-century Canadian painters
21st-century Canadian painters
21st-century Canadian novelists
French Quebecers
Governor General's Award-winning fiction writers
Artists from Quebec
Canadian women painters
Canadian women short story writers
21st-century Canadian women writers
Canadian novelists in French
20th-century Canadian women artists
21st-century Canadian women artists
21st-century Canadian short story writers